Çetes were Muslim armed irregular brigands who were active in Asia Minor after World War I. They were notorious for their assaults on Christian Orthodox Armenians, Greeks, and Assyrians during the 1910s and 1920s. 

The term was also used as a synonym for members of the Special Organization.

References

See also
Bashi-bazouk

Armenian genocide
Greek genocide
Greco-Turkish War (1919–1922)
Turkish words and phrases
History of the Ottoman Empire
Military units and formations of the Ottoman Empire